Mount Olympus, at , is the tallest and most prominent mountain in the Olympic Mountains of western Washington state, US. Located on the Olympic Peninsula, it is also the central feature of Olympic National Park. Mount Olympus is the highest summit of the Olympic Mountains; however, peaks such as Mount Constance and The Brothers, on the eastern margin of the range, are better known, being visible from the Seattle metropolitan area.

Description 
Mount Olympus has  of prominence, ranking 5th in the state of Washington.

Due to heavy winter snowfalls, Mount Olympus supports large glaciers, despite its modest elevation and relatively low latitude. As with most temperate latitude glaciers, these have all been shrinking in area and volume, and shortening in recent decades.

History 
According to Edmond S. Meany (1923), Origin of Washington geographic names, citing Joseph A. Costello (1895), The Siwash, their life, legends and tales, the Duwamish used the name Sunh-a-do for the Olympian Mountains (or Coast Range in Costello 1895) ; besides its unclear origin, some references misuse this name for the Native American name of the mountain. Upon sighting in 1774 by the Spanish explorer Juan Pérez, the mountain was named Cerro Nevado de Santa Rosalía ("Snowy Peak of Saint Rosalia"). This is said to be the first time a European named a geographic feature in what is now Washington state. In 1788, on July 4, the British explorer John Meares gave the mountain its present name.

In 1890 an expedition, led by US Army officer Joseph P. O'Neil, reached the summit, of what is today presumed to have been the southern peak.

On March 2, 1909, Mount Olympus National Monument was proclaimed by President Theodore Roosevelt. On June 28, 1938, it was designated a national park by President Franklin D. Roosevelt. In 1976 the Olympic National Park became an International Biosphere Reserve. In 1981 it was designated a World Heritage Site. In 1988 Congress designated 95% of the park as the Olympic Wilderness.

Climate
The peak of Mount Olympus has a tundra climate (ET) with extremely heavy precipitation from October to April and heavy precipitation from May to September. A large part of this precipitation falls as snow. The west peak is the wettest place in mainland USA.

See also

List of mountain peaks of North America
List of mountain peaks of the United States
List of Ultras of the United States
List of highest points in Washington by county

References

External links

 
 
 
The Mountaineers: 1920 Outing to Mt. Olympus - University of Washington Library
The Mountaineers Photography - University of Washington Library

Mountains of Washington (state)
Highest points of United States national parks
Mountains of Jefferson County, Washington
Olympic Mountains
Landforms of Olympic National Park